Praia da Samouqueira a beach within the Municipality of Aljezur, in the Algarve, Portugal. The beach is on the western Seaboard in the extreme north west of the Algarve.

Description
The beach of Praia da Samouqueira is a small secluded beach which is unspoiled and never busy. The beach is made up of sand with areas of gravel and rocky outcrops. It is an ideal place to come and enjoy the natural surroundings.

Getting there
From the EN120 road at the north end of the village of Rogil turn left down a small tarmac road (Estrada da Esteveira). Stay on this road till you reach Esteveira. From the end of the tarmac road at the oval turning point, follow the unpaved lane ignoring the forks until you reach the coast. The beach is then reached by a small trail which is steep in places and can prove difficult.

Gallery

References

Beaches of Aljezur